Chan Yun To (born 21 February 1966) is a bodybuilder from Hong Kong who won a gold medal at the 2006 Asian Games in the men's -75 kg class.

References

Living people
1966 births
Hong Kong bodybuilders
Place of birth missing (living people)
Asian Games medalists in bodybuilding
Bodybuilders at the 2006 Asian Games
Asian Games gold medalists for Hong Kong
Medalists at the 2006 Asian Games
Competitors at the 2005 World Games